Peter Allen (born 3 July 1965) is a former States of Alderney Member. He gained the highest total number of votes in the Ordinary Election  on 6 December 2008, with a total of 520.

Peter Allen was born and went to school in Alderney, after doing an apprenticeship in as an electrician, and then joined the British Army and served for seven years. Whilst serving he met and married Diane, with whom he has three children. Allen is also member of the Alderney Lifeboat crew.

Notes and references

External links
States of Alderney Website

States of Alderney Members
Living people
1965 births